The Liberty Advances (LA or LLA) is a right-wing to far-right Argentine political coalition originated in the City of Buenos Aires with a conservative tendency on social and cultural issues, while being right-libertarian on economic issues. It contested for the first time in the legislative election of 2021 obtaining the third place with 17% of the votes in the capital. The coalition is led by the economist and national deputy, Javier Milei.

After having sealed an agreement with the politician Juan José Gómez Centurión, the candidates Victoria Villarruel and María Fernanda Araujo, among other conservative leaders, joined the alliance. Javier Milei presented himself separately from the Buenos Aires candidate José Luis Espert, with whom he had previously been linked in the Avanza Libertad. The leader of the alliance, Javier Milei, has denied any relationship with the Córdoba electoral front "La Libertad Avanza".

History

Foundation 
On July 14, 2021, the alliance was formalized in the City of Buenos Aires to participate in the legislative elections of 2021, having Javier Milei and Victoria Villarruel as the main candidates for national deputies, and Ramiro Marra as the first candidate for Buenos Aires legislator. The front was formed by the parties: Integration and Development Movement (MID), Unite for Freedom and Dignity and Movement of Pensioners and Youth. This is in addition to having the support of parties without legal personality in the district, such as the NOS party, of Juan José Gómez Centurión, or the Libertarian Party.

Election campaign and primary elections 

On August 7, 2021, the front launched its electoral campaign for the primary elections, with Milei, as the protagonist of the event, in Plaza Holanda, Palermo, Buenos Aires City. Who was accompanied by Victoria Villarruel and Ramiro Marra. At the event, he emphasized criticizing "the political caste" and the National Government of Alberto Fernández.

On September 5, 2021, the front closed its electoral campaign for the 2021 primary elections in Lezama Park, San Telmo, Buenos Aires City. The event is estimated to have been attended by at least 25,000 people and focused on criticism mainly in Frente de Todos and Juntos por el Cambio. Hours before the event, Eduardo Bolsonaro, son of the president of Brazil; in a video call with Milei, he stated that he supported the candidacy of the same.

In the 2021 primary elections, the front obtained 242,839 votes for national deputies, 13.90% of the votes, and 238,797 votes, 13.82% of the votes, for Buenos Aires legislators. In this way, the front became the third force in the district, after Juntos por el Cambio and the Frente de Todos.

General election 
In the general elections, the coalition obtained 313,808 votes for national deputies, 17.04% of the votes, and 318,978 votes for Buenos Aires legislators, 16.74% of the votes. With these results they obtained 2 national deputies and 5 Porteño legislators. The coalition celebrated the results at the Luna Park Stadium, where one of the custodians threatened to draw his non-lethal weapon at the attempt of one of the spectators to get on stage.

According to the electoral campaign financing reports that were submitted after the deadline, the alliance did not obtain private financing and relied exclusively on funds provided by the State. For this reason, doubts arose about the financing of the campaign, which included events with LED screens and sound, as well as rentals such as Luna Park and the Grand View hotel. In that sense, Carlos Maslatón, one of the organizers of the campaign, excused himself by saying that the financing of political campaigns is 98% in black.

National bloc 
On April 23, 2022, the coalition held a political event, headed by Javier Milei, in O'Higgins park, Mendoza, promoted by the Democratic Party of Mendoza, with which they signed a political agreement as well as with the National Democratic Party. This agreement was put to a vote by the party's national convention on May 28. On May 16, it was confirmed that the Democratic Party of Córdoba would join the coalition structure, and that its referent, Rodolfo Eiben, had intentions of competing for the governorship of the province. On May 24, the central board of the Democratic Party of Mendoza, voted in favor of the agreement with the coalition, with 43 votes in favor, 16 against and 2 abstentions. On May 28, the national convention of the National Democratic Party, with 11 votes in favor and 3 against, voted in favor of the agreement with Javier Milei and the coalition for the presidential elections of 2023.

On April 29, an agreement was made with the Neighborhood Confederation of Entre Ríos through the Buenos Aires legislator Rebeca Fleitas, a native of that province. After various talks since November 2021, an agreement was sealed between the coalition and Alfredo Avelín (h), president of Cruzada Renovadora, in the province of San Juan during the month of May. In addition, negotiations with the party in the province of Jujuy were confirmed. In the same way, an agreement was signed with Fuerza Republicana, by Ricardo Bussi, in the province of Tucumán. A coalition political event in the province was also confirmed for July 23. After four weeks of negotiations, at the end of May, the Integration and Development Movement reached an agreement with the coalition in the province of Córdoba, joining the district assembly of the same.

Integrated parties

National

Provincial

See also 

 Liberalism
 Paleolibertarianism
 Anarcho-capitalism

References 

Far-right politics in Argentina
Right-wing parties in Argentina
Political parties established in 2021
2021 in Argentina
Political party alliances in Argentina